The Whitlam Leisure Centre is a multi-use indoor arena in western Sydney, New South Wales, Australia. It was the first home of the former NBL team West Sydney Razorbacks.

References

External links

Buildings and structures in Sydney
Defunct National Basketball League (Australia) venues
Basketball venues in Australia
Indoor arenas in Australia
Sports venues in Sydney
Tourist attractions in Sydney
West Sydney Razorbacks